South Solapur Taluka is one of the 11 tehsils of Solapur District in the Indian state of Maharashtra. This tehsil is located in the southeastern side of district and is bordered by Osmanabad District to the northeast, North Solapur and Mohol Taluka to the north, Akkalkot Taluka to the southeast, Karnataka's Kalaburagi district to the south, and Mangalvedhe Taluka to the west. The tehsil headquarters is located at Solapur, which is also the district headquarters and its largest city. Mandrup, Kumbhari, Valasang, Musti and Boramani are the biggest villages in south Solapur.  In the 16th century, in the village of Musti in the taluka, Shri Andenappa Maharaj became a great saint. He taught Parmarth to the society. During that time, he performed many miracles in the Musti village area and saved the people. Shri Andenappa maharaj was one of the great devotees of Shri Siddheshwar Maharaj, the village deity of Solapur, thats why there is a temple of Shri Siddheshwar Maharaj in Musti village and the Gadda Yatra of Shri Siddheshwar Maharaj is celebrated in Musti village in the same way as it is celebrated in Solapur.Due to the great work of Shri Andenappa Maharaj, he received divine offerings for the cure of jaundice from lord Shiva so even today, in the name of Shri Andenappa Maharaj, every Sunday treatment is given to the jaundice patient at the Shri Andenappa Maharaj Temple at Musti.

As of 2001, the tehsil population was 210,774

References

External links
The official website of Solapur district
South Solapur Tehsil on Biond

Talukas in Solapur district